is a Japanese football goalkeeper who currently plays for JEF United Chiba in the J2 League.   He has previously had spells with Yokohama F. Marinos, Tokyo Verdy and Gamba Osaka.

Club career statistics
Updated to 2 December 2018.

Reserves performance

Last Updated: 2 December 2018

Achievements
Emperor's Cup (1): 2013

References

External links

 soccermanager.com Retrieved 2015-06-06.
 goal.com Retrieved 2015-06-06.
 

1994 births
Living people
Association football people from Aichi Prefecture
Japanese footballers
Japan youth international footballers
J1 League players
J2 League players
J3 League players
Yokohama F. Marinos players
Tokyo Verdy players
J.League U-22 Selection players
Gamba Osaka players
Gamba Osaka U-23 players
JEF United Chiba players
Association football goalkeepers